The Voice of Ireland is an Irish reality talent show.  The fourth series of the programme premiered on 4 January 2015 on RTÉ One and concluded on 26 April, similar to previous seasons. Kathryn Thomas returned as main host, while her colleague Eoghan McDermott remained the show's co-host. Television personalities Bressie and Kian Egan both returned as coaches, while The Saturdays singer Una Healy and S Club 7 star Rachel Stevens filled the remaining two positions. Screentime Shinawil Productions continued to produce the talent programme.

Patrick Donoghue was crowned the winner on 26 April 2015, with his version of Jessie J's Mama Knows Best, which was later released on iTunes. He was coached by The Saturdays singer Una Healy. After winning the recording contract with Universal, Donoghue decided to change his stage name to Patrick James as he found it represented him more as an artist.

Teams

Colour key

Blind Auditions
The Blind Auditions for The Voice were filmed in The Helix on the 15, 16 and 17 October 2014. They were broadcast from 4 January  to 15 February, across seven episodes. This series, each coach had to choose 14 contestants to continue to the battle stage.

Blind Auditions 1

Blind Auditions 2

Blind Auditions 3

Blind Auditions 4

Blind Auditions 5

Blind Auditions 6

Blind Auditions 7

RTÉ 2fm Wildcards

The successful Wildcard format continued on the show. This gave singers a final opportunity to apply if they missed the application deadline. RTÉ 2FM presenters filtered the acts to find the best 5 possible contenders and they were invited to return for a blind audition with the coaches. The 2014 winner Brendan McCahey was a wildcard act, proving it to be successful.

The Battles
The Battles were filmed in The Helix on the 22 and 23 November 2014. They were then aired from 22 February to 15 March, across four episodes. The Steal returned this series, proving to be successful in season three. This is where another coach saves a losing battle act from bowing out of the competition by drafting them to their Live Shows team. Each coach had one steal and had the opportunity of putting it to use by pressing the 'I Want You' button at the end of the battle.

 Advanced
 Eliminated
 Saved

Battles 1

Battles 2

Battles 3

Battles 4

The Knockouts

Knockouts 1 (22 March)

Knockouts 2 (29 March)

Knockouts 3 (5 April)

The Live Shows
The Live Shows were aired from 22 March to 26 April. Each episode was broadcast live from The Helix and the public were able to cast their vote to save acts of their choice. As per usual, there were special performances from guest and coaches. Patrick Donoghue won the entire competition on 26 April 2015, beating runner-up Emma Humber.

Quarter Final (12 April)
Guest Performance: Brendan McCahey "Safe and Well"

Semi-final (19 April)
Guest Performances: 
Group Performance: "Hold My Hand"
HomeTown: "Cry for Help"

Final (26 April)
Guest Performances:
Coaches Performance: "Should I Stay or Should I Go"
Ryan Sheridan: "Here and Now"
Group Performance: "I Lived"

Results summary
Color keys
Artist's info

Result details

References

External links
Official Site

4
2015 Irish television seasons